The 2007 Louisville Cardinals football team represented the University of Louisville in the 2007 NCAA Division I FBS football season. The team, led by Steve Kragthorpe in his first year at the school, played their home games in Papa John's Cardinal Stadium and were in their third year in the Big East Conference.  With the stunning upsets, the team has missed a bowl game for the first time in a decade (since 1997).

Pre-season
The Cardinals finished the 2006 season with a 12–1 record, including a win in the Orange Bowl. After the win, they were ranked fifth in the nation. Returning fourteen starters from their 2006 team, including quarterback Brian Brohm the team was picked, by the Big East media, to finish second in the conference, and were ranked between five and 13 in various preseason polls.

Coaching changes
Almost a week after their victory in the Orange Bowl, head coach, Bobby Petrino, was offered and took the head coaching position with the NFL's Atlanta Falcons. Two days later, Steve Kragthorpe, former head coach for the Tulsa Golden Hurricane, was hired for the position. Though five assistant coaches were retained, five new assistants were hired in the off-season, three of which came with Kragthorpe from his staff at Tulsa.

Roster changes
Although returning 14 starters from 2006, the team lost four players to the 2007 NFL Draft. From the offense, running back Michael Bush was taken in the fourth round by Oakland and running back Kolby Smith was taken in the fifth round by Kansas City. From the defense, tackle Amobi Okoye was taken tenth by Houston while cornerback, William Gay was taken in the fifth round by Pittsburgh.

Recruiting
The Cardinals signed 15 recruits for the new class, including three junior-college transfers. Included in the top-50 class were one five-star recruit on defense, three four-star recruits on offense and another four-star recruit on defense. Also entering in with the class was 2006 recruit Josh Chichester, who wasn't able to enroll with his recruiting class.

Pre-season honors
Three Cardinal players were honored as part of pre-season watchlists for national awards.

Brian Brohm - Manning Award and Maxwell Award
Adrian Grady - Bronko Nagurski Trophy
Eric Wood - Outland Trophy

In addition to the honors, Brohm was also named to the Playboy pre-season All-America team.

Season

Roster

Coaching staff
The 2007 Cardinal team was coached by Steve Kragthorpe and his staff. Much of the coaching staff from 2006 remained, but Kragthorpe brought in other to fill out the staff, including, initially, three from his previous position. Keith Patterson was originally brought in from Tulsa as defensive coordinator and cornerbacks coach, however returned to Tulsa before the season began for personal reasons. Patterson was quickly replaced by Mike Mallory.

Schedule

References

Louisville
Louisville Cardinals football seasons
Louisville Cardinals football